Yadanabon is a 1953 Burmese black-and-white drama film, directed by Tin Maung starring Tin Maung, Kyi Kyi Htay, Tin Tin Mu and Maung Aye Kyu. A1 Film Company won the Best Picture Award and Tin Maung won the Best Actor Award in 1953 Myanmar Motion Picture Academy Awards.

Cast
Tin Maung as Htun Myat
Kyi Kyi Htay as Khin Sein Kyi
Tin Tin Mu as Mi Mi Yee
Maung Aye Kyu as Thet Nyunt

References

1953 films
1950s Burmese-language films
Films shot in Myanmar
Burmese black-and-white films
Burmese drama films
1953 drama films